Church of Saint Basil of Ostrog is a Serbian Orthodox Church located in Bežanijska Kosa neighbourhood of New Belgrade. Its construction started in 1996 and completed in 2001, and is the first church built in New Belgrade since World War II. The architect Mihajlo Mitrović adopted an "old Christian"  rotunda-plan combined with side galleries and a tall bell-tower to the west. Funding for the project was provided by civilians, whom the saint is known to as the Miracle maker.

Gallery

References

External links 
 Official site of the Church of St Basil of Ostrog

Serbian Orthodox churches in Belgrade
Churches completed in 2001
21st-century Serbian Orthodox church buildings
Round churches
Church buildings with domes
Byzantine Revival architecture in Serbia
2001 establishments in Serbia
New Belgrade